Chorley Borough may refer to:

Two different rugby league teams which played at Chorley, Lancashire:
 Blackpool Borough played as Chorley Borough in the 1988–89 season.
 The side which became Chorley Lynx played as Chorley Borough from 1989 to 1995.
The medieval borough of Chorley (13th century)
The Municipal Borough of Chorley (1881–1974)
The non-metropolitan Borough of Chorley, created in 1974